Anna Mudeka is a Zimbabwean-British musician, business executive and music festival organizer. She is the organizer of the Southburgh Festival of World Music in Southburgh in the Breckland district of mid-Norfolk, East Anglia, England. 
The festival raises money for the Mudeka Foundation, a charity that seeks "... to provide orphans  in Zimbabwe with an opportunity for an education."

References

External links

1976 births
Living people
Zimbabwean musicians
British women business executives
Music festival founders